Molla Balut (also Romanized as Mollā Balūţ; also known as Mollāy-ye Balūţ) is a village in Khafri Rural District, in the Central District of Sepidan County, Fars Province, Iran. At the 2006 census, its population was 44, in 11 families.

References 

Populated places in Sepidan County